Come Let Us Sing Anyway, also known as Come Let Us Sing Anyway and other short stories, is a 2017 collection of stories by British author Leone Ross. The volume marks the first time that her short stories have been collected together.

Stories
The twenty-three stories collected predominantly focus on Jamaican women or women of Jamaican ancestry. Stories in the collection include: 

 “Drag”
 “Art for ****’s Sake”
 “And You Know This” 
 “Breathing”
 “The Woman Who Lived in a Restaurant” 
 “The Heart Has No Bones”
 "Love Silk Food"
 "Velvet Man” 
 “What He Is”
 “Phone Call to a London Rape Crisis Centre” 
 “The Mullerian Eminence”
 “Roll it”
 “Breakfast time”
 “President Daisy” 
 “Covenant” 
 “Mudman”

Themes 
The stories in Come Let Us Sing Anyway feature a variety of themes that include pain, love, and beauty.

Release
Come Let Us Sing Anyway was first published in the United Kingdom in 2017 through Peepal Tree Press. It marks the first time that Ross has published a collection of her short stories.

Reception
Critical reception for Come Let Us Sing Anyway has been positive. The Guardian praised the collection, stating that it "demonstrates her imaginative power and great psychological depth."

References

British short story collections
Cultural depictions of Jamaican people
2017 short story collections
Peepal Tree Press books